Jefferson Township is a township in Clayton County, Iowa, USA.  As of the 2000 census, its population was 2,721.

Geography
According to the USGS, it contains nine cemeteries: Borcherding, Guttenberg, Lewis, Mount Olivet, Saint Johns, Saint Marys, Saint Michael, Saint Pauls and Stock School.

Frenchtown Lake is within this township. The streams of Buck Creek, Carlan Creek, Miners Creek, Price Branch and South Cedar Creek run through this township.

Transportation
Jefferson Township contains three airports or landing strips: Abels Island Airport, GAA Private Airport and Walters Heliport.

References
 USGS Geographic Names Information System (GNIS)

External links
 US-Counties.com
 City-Data.com

Townships in Clayton County, Iowa
Townships in Iowa